RPIMA may refer to:

1er RPIMa
3e RPIMa
8e RPIMa